John Read le Brockton Tomlin (15 August 1864 – 24 December 1954) was a British malacologist. He was one of the founders of the Malacological Society of London and was president of the Conchological Society of Great Britain & Ireland on two separate occasions.

Tomlin named more than a hundred taxa of gastropod molluscs, including:

  The family Abyssochrysoidea Tomlin, 1927
 The family Columbariidae Tomlin, 1928

He also named some scaphopods and bivalves.

References

Further reading
 Proceedings of the Malacological Society of London 16(1): frontispiece [portrait] [1924].
 Anonymous, 1955. J. R. le B. Tomlin. Proceedings of the Royal Entomological Society of London (Series C, Journal of Meetings) 19(11): 69-70.
 E. A. Salisbury, 1955. Obituary. J. R. le B. Tomlin, 1864-1954. Journal of Conchology 24(2): 29-39, pl. 2 [portrait; list of taxa].
 H. O. Ricketts & A. E. Salisbury, 1954. List of papers on Mollusca and obituaries of conchologists published by the late J. R. le B. Tomlin. Proceedings of the Malacological Society of London 31(3-4): 87-94.
 A. E. Salisbury, 1955. J. R. le B. Tomlin, 1864-1954. Proceedings of the Malacological Society of London 31(3-4): 85-87.
 Abbott, 1963: 29. Barnard, 1965: 30.
 S. P. Dance, 1971. The Melvill-Tomlin shell collection: legacy of a great collector. Amgueddfa (Cardiff) 8: 27-33.
 Cleevely, 1983 288-289. Dance, 1986: 174-175, 228. Trew, 1987: 82.
 N. McMillan, 1990. John Reade [sic] Le Brockton Tomlin (1864–1954). The Conchologists' Newsletter 113: 291-292.
 A. Trew, 1990. John R. le B. Tomlin’s new molluscan names. Cardiff: National Museum of Wales, 101 pp.
 Trew, 1993: 85.
 A. N. van der Bijl, 1995. Het kontakt van M. M. Schepman met J. C. Melvill en J. R. le B. Tomlin. Correspondentieblad van de Nederlandse Malacologische Vereniging 285: 86-92.
 Fouché, 1995: 10.
 J. E. Chatfield, 1998. Shells at Hastings: the shell collections at Hastings Museum and Art Gallery, East Sussex. The Conchologists' Newsletter 147: 90-102.
 Muñiz Solís, 2002: 278.
 J. Gallichan, 2003. Documenting the past: insights into the Tomlin archive. Mollusc World 3: 11.
 J. Gallichan, 2007. Documenting the past: the Tomlin Archive. P. 68, in: K. Jordaens, et al., eds., World Congress of Malacology Antwerp 15–20 July 2007, Abstracts, lxxix + 298 pp.

External links 
 "New molluscan names proposed by J. R. le B. Tomlin"

1864 births
1954 deaths
British malacologists